The Minister for Finance is a member of the cabinet in the Welsh Government, responsible for the management of the budget, tax and borrowing, oversight of financial accounting and audit, and oversight of any Private Finance Initiative, amongst others.

List of Ministers

References

Government of Wales